Peroxisomal 3,2-trans-enoyl-CoA isomerase is an enzyme that in humans is encoded by the PECI gene.

PECI is an auxiliary enzyme that catalyzes an isomerization step required for the beta-oxidation of unsaturated fatty acids.[supplied by OMIM]

References

Further reading